Heeks is a surname. Notable people with the surname include:

 Richard Heeks, British academic
 Willi Heeks (1922–1996), German racing driver

See also
 Meeks